The  was a Japanese coin worth one tenth of a Japanese yen, as 100 sen equalled 1 yen. These coins were minted from the late 19th century up until the end of World War II.

History

Meiji coinage (1870–1912)

Ten sen coins were first struck towards the end of 1870 (year 3 of Meiji) from a newly established mint at Osaka. This was initially done by engineers from the United Kingdom, as Japan did not have the technology or raw materials to manufacture new coins. The coins made during this time were not officially released for circulation until the following year (1871) after a new currency act was promulgated. Ten sen coins along with twelve other denominations were adopted by the Meiji government in an act signed on June 27, 1871. This new coinage gave Japan a western style decimal system based on units of yen, which were broken down into subsidiary currency of sen, and rin. Ten sen coins dated 1870 (year 3) were initially authorized to be struck in .800 silver, weighs 38.6 grains (2.5g), and has a 18.28mm diameter (0.72 in). The obverse side of these coins (1st design) feature a dragon with an open mouth. On the reverse there is a paulownia decoration with a sunburst in the center, and the chrysanthemum seal up on top. This first design is nicknamed , which had its features engraved by a commission of Japanese artists. Ten sen coins were initially legal tender only up to the amount of 10 yen which was fixed by government regulations. The amount of silver in the coin soon became an issue as their weight per face value became lighter than the silver 1 yen coin. An amendment to the currency act (Daijo-kan Declaration No. 74) was adopted in March 1872 (year 5) which intended to increase the weight of the ten sen coin. This action was never carried out, and the currency act was amended again towards the end of the year. Changes to the design, weight, and features were implemented in 1873 (year 6). Ten sen coins kept their intended weight change to 41.6 grains (2.69 grams), while the diameter remained the same. The second design has a "western style" as the medallic orientation was flipped, and 10 SEN replaced the kanji below the dragon on the obverse side. The reverse side features leaves of paulownia and a chrysanthemum seal up on top with the value written in Kanji.

The production of ten sen coins continued until at least June 30, 1879 with the latter two years dated "1877". Only proof strikes were made for coins dated 1880 (year 13) for exclusive use in presentation sets. Production eventually continued with ten sen coins dated 1885 (year 18), and continued through 1897 (year 30). During this year, Japan officially went onto the gold standard through the newly established coinage act of 1897 (Meiji 30 Law No. 16). The act had no effect on the ten sen coin which continued to be produced unchanged until 1906 (year 39). An amendment to the 1897 coinage act was implemented this year which gave the ten,  twenty, and fifty sen coins new designs. Previously the second design had been in place for 33 years which is the longest lasting of all coins excluding the current postwar currency. The third design features a wreath on the obverse with the value written in kanji in the center, while on the obverse is a sunburst surrounded by flowers. Problems soon arose with the design transition when the market price of silver exceeded the face value of the ten sen coin. Coins dated 1906 (year 39) were originally made using two different designs. The second design was used for coins produced until March, while the third design was used for coins produced from June 1906 to January 1907. The latter of these coins had been distributed to the banks but not released yet when another amendment to the coinage act was made in March 1907. Ten sen coins by law had their silver content lowered from .800 to .720, and their weight from 2.7 to 2.3 grams. All of the 1906 dated third design coins were melted except for one which is preserved at the Japan Mint. The third design was released for circulation when 1907 (year 40) dated coins were produced in August of that year. These were issued every year afterward until the death of Emperor Meiji in 1912 (year 45).

Taishō coinage (1912–1926)

Production resumed under Emperor Taishō in 1912 and World War I broke out two years later. This event brought Japan a booming economy which required an increase of small denomination coins. The rising metal costs to produce the coins eventually became an issue again for ten sen coins. Ten sen coins were struck in silver until the end of 1917 (Taishō year 6), when an announcement was made to replace the coins with fractional bank notes. The coinage act of 1897 was amended again and went into effect on May 1, 1918 providing coinage as needed. Ten sen coins dated 1918 and 1919 (year 7 and 8) were produced in silver under this amendment which were stored at the Bank of Japan to prepare exchanges for ten sen notes. Production continued for ten sen silver coins until they were discontinued sometime in 1922 (year 11). For reasons unknown these coins were never distributed and possible reasoning depends on the literature used. It remains debatable if these coins were ever meant for circulation versus use as trial or pattern strikes. Most were eventually melted down at the mint into bullion and shipped overseas by 1923 (year 12) leaving ten pieces behind at the mint. Ten sen copper nickel coins were authorized by the Imperial ordinance of August 26, 1920. These coins weigh 57.86 grains (3.75g), have a 22.12 mm diameter, and a 4.55 mm central hole. The chosen design features a chrysanthemum seal, and a bouquet of paulownia flowers on the obverse, while the reverse side uses Qinghai waves. This same ordinance also reduced the size of the 5 sen coin to avoid confusion as they were too similar. Ten sen copper nickel coins were later produced in large amounts which peaked in 1922 and 1923 (year 11 and 12). This was done to encourage the public to redeem old ten sen notes for coins, which lasted into the Shōwa era. No additional changes to coinage were made during the remainder of Emperor Taishō's reign, he eventually died in 1926 (year 15).

Shōwa coinage (1927–1946)

Ten sen coins were produced again in 1927 (year 2 of Shōwa) following the death of Taishō in the previous year. Copper nickel coins continued to be produced until 1932 (year 7) as the 1897 coinage act was amended for a final time in the following year. The width of the coin dropped slightly by 0.1mm to 22mm, and the weight was increased from 3.8 to 4 grams. Pure nickel was chosen as an alloy as an anti-counterfeiting measure because it was difficult to process with the technology of the time. Another reason has to do with the Mukden Incident in 1931 (year 6), and subsequent Japanese invasion of Manchuria. Nickel was being stockpiled as the metal was not produced in Japan, and could be used in the event of a larger conflict. The design of the nickel coins was chosen based on ideas solicited from the general public, and pattern coins were made. This design features the chrysanthemum seal and paulownia surrounded by arabesque on the obverse, while the reverse features a Qinghai wave design. These pure nickel coins substituted the old copper-nickel coins starting on April 1, 1933 (year 8). Production continued for another four years before the Second Sino-Japanese War broke out with the Marco Polo Bridge Incident in July 1937 (year 12). Ten sen coins were changed during this time as nickel was needed for warfare.

The National Mobilization Law was legislated in the Diet of Japan by Prime Minister Fumimaro Konoe on March 24, 1938 to prepare the country for war. This action led to the promulgation of the "Temporary Currency Law" which came into effect on June 1, 1938. It now became possible to change the material and purity of money without a resolution from the Imperial Diet. An aluminium bronze alloy consisting of 95% copper and 5% aluminium replaced the nickel coins as the latter was needed for munitions. Pattern coins dated 1937 and 1938 (year 12 and 13) were made, but little is now known about them. The only changes made to the coin other than the alloy was a new design and a smaller central hole. On the obverse side, waves are featured along with a sunburst and chrysanthemum seal, while the reverse features a grooved cherry blossom design with paulownia. These coins were only produced for two years before an increased wartime demand for copper caused another alloy change. Ten sen coins were switched to a pure aluminum alloy on March 28, 1940 (year 15) by Royal Decree No. 113. The size of the coins remained the same, while the light aluminum alloy cut the weight of the coins by more than half from 4 to 1.5 grams. These coins feature a chrysanthemum seal with leaves on the obverse, and a cherry blossom design on the reverse. The war situation eventually grew worse for Japan which meant more aluminum was needed for aircraft. Ten sen coins had their weight lowered from 1.5 to 1.2 grams on August 27, 1941 by Royal Decree No. 826 to meet this demand. Things deteriorated further when the Second Sino-Japanese War merged three months later to become the broader Pacific War. Japan did not produce certain metals, which meant that additional supplies would now have to come from long distances.

Coins made from nickel and copper began to be withdrawn by the Japanese government in December 1942, replacing them for aluminum coinage. More aluminum was taken out of ten sen coins on February 5, 1943 by Royal Decree No. 60. This action lowered the weight of the coin further from 1.2 to 1 gram as the metal became difficult to obtain. An announcement by the Japanese government was eventually made in April 1943 regarding plans to replace aluminum coinage with tin. Aluminum was officially abolished for coinage by the end of the year in favor of the new alternate alloy. One of the main reasons for using tin centered around it being relatively easy to obtain from occupied territories in Southeast Asia. The decision was not made lightly, as tin was a strategic material which is unsuitable for monetary purposes as the metal is soft. Ten sen coins using this alloy were enacted on March 8, 1944 by Royal Decree No. 388. These coins are reduced in size from 22 to 19mm, the weight was increased from 1 to 2.4 grams, and a central 5mm hole was added. The design for these coins simply feature a chrysanthemum seal and paulownia on the obverse, and inscriptions on the back. Production only occurred for a few months before being discontinued due to allied air superiority and control over the seas. Ten sen notes were ultimately issued when materials could no longer be secured for coins. Unissued porcelain ten sen pieces were also made, but were mostly destroyed when World War II ended. 

Ten sen coins were brought back into production in December 1945 and were officially enacted on January 26, 1946 (Showa 21) with an aluminum alloy. These hole-less coins are the same weight and size as the previously made final 1943 issue. The final design employs symbols of Japan with rice ears and the chrysanthemum seal on the obverse, and cherry blossoms on the reverse. Their production lasted only two years before being discontinued due to a lack of remaining wartime supplies. Ten sen coins were eventually demonetized at the end of 1953 when the Japanese government passed a law abolishing subsidiary coinage in favor of the yen. Currencies of less than one yen were rarely used by this time due to excessive post-war inflation.

Composition and size

Circulation figures

Meiji
The following are circulation figures for ten sen coins that were minted between the 3rd, and the 45th year of Meiji's reign. The dates all begin with the Japanese symbol 明治 (Meiji), followed by the year of his reign the coin was minted. Each coin is read clockwise from right to left, so in the example used below "二十三" would read as "year 32" or 1899. Some of the mintages included cover more than one variety of a given coin.

"Year" ← "Number representing year of reign" ← "Emperors name" (Ex: 年 ← 二十三 ← 治明)

Taishō

The following are circulation figures for ten sen coins that were minted between the 1st and the 15th (last) year of Taishō's reign. The dates all begin with the Japanese symbol 大正 (Taishō), followed by the year of his reign the coin was minted. Each coin is read clockwise from right to left, so in the example used below "四" would read as "year 4" or 1915.

"Year" ← "Number representing year of reign" ← "Emperors name" (Ex: 年 ← 四 ← 正大)

Shōwa
The following are circulation figures for ten sen coins that were minted between the 2nd, and the 21st year of Emperor Shōwa's reign. The dates all begin with the Japanese symbol 昭和 (Shōwa), followed by the year of his reign the coin was minted. Each coin is read clockwise from right to left, so in the example used below "二十"  would read as "year 12" or 1937. Coin patterns that include examples struck on porcelain are not included here as they were never issued for circulation.

"Year" ← "Number representing year of reign" ← "Emperors name" (Ex: 年 ← 二十 ← 和昭)

Shōwa era designs
Six different designs were used during the Shōwa era for the 10 sen coin, not including pattern coins which were never intended for circulation. As the weight and sizes were changed frequently after 1940, these designs have been listed separate with their respective information.

Collecting
The value of any given coin is determined by survivability rate and condition as collectors in general prefer uncleaned appealing coins. For this denomination, there are a few major varieties and multiple design changes which occurred during three different imperial eras. The first coins minted are Asahi Ryu or rising sun dragon coinage which only has one year (Meiji 3), but consists of two different varieties regarding scales on the dragons design. As with the other denominations, those with clear (deep) scales are worth more than obscure (shallow) ones. Overall these first year of issuance coins are "reasonably priced" with average value in the several thousands of yen. The second design was much longer lasting in comparison as it was featured on coins from 1873 to 1906 (year 6 to 39). Another similarity with other denominations occurs here with the character "明" in Meiji's name on the obverse. Coins dated 1873 and 1875 (year 6 and 8) either have both features separated as the first variety, or have a line connecting both the left and right features as the second variety. Those with the second "connected" variety are worth more than their counterparts. With a mintage of just 77 coins, ten sen coins dated 1880 (year 13) are not even listed by some Japanese price guides. They are estimated to be worth in the low millions of yen. An overall assessment on coins made from 1873 to 1906 has common dates valued at 1000 yen in average condition. Rare dates include; 1874, 1901, and 1902 (Meiji 7, 34 and 35) and are potentially worth more than 10,000 yen in average condition. The third design is used on the last of the ten sen silver coins dated from 1907 to 1917. As there are a lot of surviving coins for these dates, they are generally priced lower except for those in high grades. 

Copper-nickel coins debuted under Emperor Taishō in 1920 (year 9 of Taishō) as the price of silver bullion had risen too high. The most valuable of these coins under Taishō were made during this first year. Production amounts increased afterwards for the remainder of Taishō's reign to redeem 10 sen notes, which left plenty of surviving coins for collectors to obtain. These amounts in general drop with coins produced from 1927 to 1932 (year 2-7) of the Shōwa era. When ten sen coins were switched to nickel, a lot of these may have been redeemed at the bank. Coins of this period can still be collected "relatively easily" as enough surviving coins remain. An anomaly occurs with coins dated 1929 (year 4) and 1931 (year 6) in terms of value. As the number of existing coins in good condition for 1931 outnumbers those from 1929 (year 4), the latter higher mintage date is more valuable. As a caveat, there were a "considerable" amount of contemporary counterfeit coins sold at the time as the value of the metal was low relative to the coin's face value. 

There is nothing "particularly rare" about the nickel series issued from 1933 to 1937 (year 8 to 12) other than proof strikes which are valued in the hundreds of thousands of yen. Nickel ten sen coins are usually found in better conditions as the alloy is a stable resistant metal. Aluminum bronze coins made from 1938 to 1940 (Year 13 to 15) were released for such a short time that many of them were held on to. The aluminum coins that replaced these were produced in even larger amounts in three different varieties. Scarce 1943 (year 18) dated coins weighing 1.2 grams are the most valuable among these and carry a premium. Post-war inflation made coins produced from 1944 to 1946 (year 19 to 21) essentially worthless which gave the public no incentive to cash them in. These coins have low value as an abundance of survivors in all conditions can easily be obtained by collectors.

Notes

References

Coins of Japan
Japanese sen
Ten-cent coins